Isaac Hempstead Wright is a British actor. He is best known for his role as Bran Stark in the HBO television series Game of Thrones (2011–2019), which earned him a Young Artist Award nomination as Best Young Supporting Actor in a TV Series. He also voiced Eggs in the 2014 animated film The Boxtrolls.

Early life
Isaac Hempstead Wright was born in Surrey, England. His mother and father are both teachers, and his step-father runs a printing company.
He studied at Queen Elizabeth's Grammar School, Faversham, Kent. 
He had no interest in acting until he joined a drama club to avoid playing football on Saturday mornings during the cold months of the year; he later studied acting at the Kent Youth Theatre in Canterbury.

Career
Hempstead Wright began his acting career by auditioning and acting in commercials. 

Hempstead Wright's big break was as Bran Stark in the hit television series Game of Thrones, which premiered in April 2011. He was part of the initial starring cast and remained a member of the starring cast for the second, third, and fourth seasons, which earned him two Screen Actors Guild Awards nominations as Outstanding Performance by an Ensemble in Drama Series at the 18th and 20th Screen Actors Guild Awards. He did not appear in Season 5, but returned as part of the main cast in season 6. The eighth and final season of the show premiered in April 2019, with Hempstead Wright in a starring role, making him one of a handful of Game of Thrones actors who have remained on the show over its nine years of production.

Hempstead Wright's film debut was as Tom Hill in the horror film The Awakening, which premiered in September 2011. Hempstead Wright also had a supporting role in the 2013 crime thriller Closed Circuit. Hempstead Wright also voice acted in the 2014 animated fantasy-comedy film, The Boxtrolls, a 2014 episode of the American show Family Guy, and Part 2 of the 2016 TV special Revolting Rhymes.

Hempstead Wright appears in the Foals song "Exits" music video. Directed by Albert Moya, it also features French actress Christa Théret as students at a clandestine fencing academy in a random series of interconnected vignettes of a surrealist nature. The video was filmed in Budapest.

In 2018, Hempstead Wright was cast in the feature film The Blue Mauritius. The heist movie was expected to begin filming in Cape Town, South Africa in mid-2018 but has remained in pre-production. As of 2021, he is still attached to the project.

In April 2019, it was announced that Hempstead Wright was attached to the upcoming sci-fi film Voyagers as part of an ensemble cast which includes Colin Farrell and Tye Sheridan. The film was produced in 2019 and was released in April 2021.

Personal life
Beginning in 2017, Hempstead Wright was a student at the University of Birmingham until dropping out early in order to focus on his acting career. In 2019 he returned to university to study neuroscience in London, saying that he intended to continue to act while doing so. 

In December 2019, Hempstead Wright, a secular humanist, became a patron of the humanist charity Humanists UK.

Filmography

Film

Television

Awards and nominations

References

External links 
 

Year of birth missing (living people)
Living people
21st-century English male actors
English male child actors
English male film actors
English male television actors
English male voice actors
English humanists
Male actors from Surrey
People from Faversham